SCSS may refer to:
 SCSS, Sass Cascading Style Sheet (Sassy CSS) (language)
 SCSS, the Conversational/Columnar SPSS software package
 Swiss Cottage Secondary School, a secondary school in Bukit Batok, Singapore